Buti-ye Bala (also Romanized as Būtī-ye Bālā; also known as Būtī) is a village in Polan Rural District, Polan District, Chabahar County, Sistan and Baluchestan Province, Iran. At the 2006 census, its population was 973, in 190 families.

References 

Populated places in Chabahar County